
Landor may refer to:

People
 Walter Savage Landor (1775–1864), English poet
 Robert Eyres Landor (1781–1869), English writer and clergyman, brother of Walter Savage Landor
 Arnold Henry Savage Landor (1865–1924), English painter, anthropologist and travel writer, grandson of Walter Savage Landor
 Walter Landor (1913–1995), German-American brand designer
 Rosalyn Landor (born 1958), English actress
 Henry Landor (1815–1877), Western Australian settler, and later first medical superintendent of the Asylum For The Insane, London, Ontario

Places
 Landor River, a river in Western Australia
 Landor Station, a pastoral lease in Western Australia
 Lándor, the Hungarian name for Nandra village, Bichiș Commune, Mureș County, Romania

Other uses
 Landor (company), a global branding agency
 A piece in the game Stratego: Legends by Avalon Hill

See also
 Landauer, a surname
 Landore